Tromegja is a village in the municipality of Kumanovo, North Macedonia.

Demographics
As of the 2021 census, Tromegja had 1,157 residents with the following ethnic composition:
Macedonians 757
Serbs 389
Persons for whom data are taken from administrative sources 34
Others 7

According to the 2002 census, the village had a total of 1298 inhabitants. Ethnic groups in the village include:

Macedonians - 692
Serbs - 604
Others - 2

References

External links

Villages in Kumanovo Municipality